Calvatone is a comune (municipality) in the Province of Cremona, Lombardy, located about  southeast of Milan and about  east of Cremona. Its territory is crossed by the Oglio River. In Roman times it was known as Bedriacum.

History 
The two Battles of Bedriacum were fought nearby in 69 AD.

Symbols 
The coat of arms and banner of the municipality of Calvatone were granted by Presidential Decree of April 24, 2000.

References

External links
 Official website
 Archaeological excavations at Calvatone-Bedriacum - Universitas Studiorum Mediolanensis

Cities and towns in Lombardy